The Cecelia Memorial Presbyterian Church is a historic church at 716 College Street in Bowling Green, Kentucky.  It was built in 1845 and added to the National Register in 1979.

It is a one-story brick structure.  It was the first Christian church in Bowling Green.  It was named for Cecilia Lillard, one of its original members.

References

External links
Website

Presbyterian churches in Kentucky
Churches on the National Register of Historic Places in Kentucky
Churches completed in 1845
19th-century Presbyterian church buildings in the United States
National Register of Historic Places in Bowling Green, Kentucky
Churches in Warren County, Kentucky
1845 establishments in Kentucky
Greek Revival church buildings in Kentucky